is a Japanese manga series written by Ippon Takegushi and illustrated by Santa Mitarashi. It was serialized in Shueisha's Weekly Shōnen Jump from April to September 2021, with its chapters collected into three tankōbon volumes.

Premise 
Described as a "sweets battle-comedy", the series follows Tsumugi Minase, a "sweets-user" who wields a lollipop weapon thanks to the Toy Toy Candy, a confection that gives those who eat it magic candy powers. However, the power of that same lollipop candy destroyed the city of Tokyo five years ago, therefore she cannot let anyone know of her ability.

Publication 
Candy Flurry is written by Ippon Takegushi and illustrated by Santa Mitarashi. The series was serialized in Shueisha's Weekly Shōnen Jump from April 19 to September 13, 2021. Shueisha collected its chapters into three tankōbon volumes, released from August 4 to December 3, 2021.

The series has been licensed for simultaneous publication in North America as it is released in Japan, with its chapters being digitally launched in English by Shueisha on its Manga Plus service, as well as by Viz Media on its service.

Volume list 

|}

Reception 
Hannah Alton of Comic Book Resources praised the first two chapters of Candy Flurry, calling it a "sweet surprise", saying the manga "is off to a promising start thanks to its unique premise and endearing characters." She also believed that "it could be the next big thing in Jump" so long as its unique premise does not make the series too obscure.

Notes

References

External links 
  
 
 
 

2021 manga
Action anime and manga
Comedy anime and manga
Confectionery in fiction
Shōnen manga
Shueisha manga
Viz Media manga